Aleksa Jovanović  (19 August 1846 – 6 May 1920) was a Serbian judge and politician who held the post of Prime Minister of Serbia and Minister of Foreign Affairs.

He was awarded Order of the White Eagle.

Selected works
Istorijski razvitak srpske zadruge (1896)
Izborno pravo ženskinja u Kraljevini Srbiji (1898)
Prinosci za istoriju srpskog prava (1900)
Ministarstvo Alekse Jovanovića (1906).

References

1846 births
1920 deaths
People from Ćuprija
Government ministers of Serbia
19th-century Serbian people